Chandulal Jesangbhai Shah (13 April 1898 – 25 November 1975) was a famous director, producer and screenwriter of Indian films, who founded Ranjit Studios in 1929.

Early life 
Shah was born in 1898 in Jamnagar, Gujarat, British India. He studied at Sydenham College in Bombay (now Mumbai) and got a job at the Bombay Stock Exchange in 1924. While waiting to get a job he helped his brother, J. D. Shah, who was a writer for mythological films. He was called by the "Laxmi Film Company" to direct a film Vimla in 1925 as its director Manilal Joshi was bedridden. Chandulal Shah not only directed the film but also went on to do two more films for the company, Panch Danda (1925) and Madhav Kam Kundala (1926) before returning to the Stock Exchange.

Film career
Amarchand Shroff, a friend of Shah, who was with the Laxmi Film Company, brought him to Kohinoor Film Company where he first came into contact with Gohar, a contact that eventually developed into both a personal and professional relationship.

The first film independently directed by him at Kohinoor was Typist Girl (1926) starring Sulochana and Gohar which was made in 17 days. The film did extremely well at the box-office leading Shah to direct another five films for the studio all featuring Gohar. Of these, the most famous was Gunsundari (1927).

In 1929 Chandulal Shah founded Ranjit Studios at Bombay, Maharashtra. It produced films between 1929 and mid-1970s. The company began production of silent films in 1929 under the banner Ranjit Film Company and by 1932 had made 39 pictures, most of them social dramas. The company changed its name to Ranjit Movietone in 1932 and during the 1930s produced numerous successful talkies at the rate of about six a year. At this time, the studio employed around 300 actors, technicians and other employees. With the advent of sound, Ranjit Film Company became Ranjit Movietone.

Besides Filmmaking, Chandulal Shah also devoted a lot of time to the organizational work of the Indian Film Industry. Both the Silver Jubilee (1939) and the Golden Jubilee of the Indian film Industry (1963) were celebrated under his guidance. He was the first president of The Film Federation of India formed in 1951 and even led an Indian delegation to Hollywood the following year.

Later life and death
Shah's downfall started when Raj Kapoor and Nargis starrer Paapi failed at the box office, followed by Zameen ke Taare. He took to gambling and horse racing. On 25 November 1975, the industry's most powerful man, who once owned a fleet of cars, was reduced to travelling in buses and died penniless.

Filmography

Director

 Zameen Ke Tare (1960)
 Oot Patang (1955)
 Papi (1953)
 Achhut (1940)
 Pardesi Pankhi (1937)
 Prabhu Ka Pyara (1936)
 Sipahi Ki Sajni (1936)
 Sipahini Sajni (1936)
 Barrister's Wife (1935)
 Desh Dasi (1935)
 Keemti Aansoo (1935)
 Toofani Taruni (1934)
 Gunsundari (1934)
 Miss 1933 (1933)
 Radha Rani (1932)
 Sati Savitri (1932)
 Sheil Bala (1932)
 Devi Devayani (1931)
 Diwani Dilbar (1930)
 My Darling (1930)
 Raj Lakshmi (1930)
 Bhikharan (1929)
 Chandramukhi (1929)
 Pati Patni (1929)
 Rajputani (1929)
 Grihalakshmi (1928)
 Vishwamohini (1928)
 Gunsundari (1927)
 Sindh Ni Sumari (1927)
 Madhav Kam Kundala (1926)
 Five Divine Wands (1925)
 Vimla (1925)
 Panchdanda (1925)
 Typist Girl (1925)

Writer

 Akeli Mat Jaiyo (1963) [story & screenplay as Chandulal J. Shah]
 Papi (1953) [story, scenario & dialogue]
 Achhut (1940)
 Prabhu Ka Pyara (1936)
 Sipahi Ki Sajni (1936)
 Sipahini Sajni (1936)
 Gunsundari (1934)
 Sati Savitri (1932) [story]

Producer

 Akeli Mat Jaiyo (1963)
 Aurat Teri Yahi Kahani (1954)
 Dhobi Doctor (1954)
 Bahadur (1953)
 Footpath (1953)
 Papi (1953)
 Humlog (1951)
 Jogan (1950) (uncredited)
 Madhubala (1950)
 Nili (1950)
 Bhool Bhulaiya (1949)
 Garibi (1949)
 Nazare (1949)
 Bichhade Balam (1948)
 Jai Hanuman (1948)
 Mitti Ke Khiloune (1948)
 Pardesi Mehman (1948)
 Bela (1947)
 Chhin Le Azadi (1947)
 Duniya Ek Sarai (1947)
 Kaum Hamara (1947)
 Lakhon Mein Ek (1947)
 Piya Ghar Aja (1947)
 Woh Zamana (1947)
 Dharti (1946)
 Phoolwari (1946)
 Rajputani (1946)
 Chand Chakori (1945)
 Moorti (1945)
 Prabhuka Ghar (1945)
 Bhanvara (1944)
 Caravan (1944)
 Mumtaz Mahal (1944)
 Pagli Duniya (1944)
 Shahenshah Babar (1944)
 Andhera (1943)
 Bansari (1943)
 Gauri (1943)
 Nurse (1943)
 Shankar Parvati (1943)
 Tansen (1943)
 Vishkanya (1943)
 Armaan (1942)
 Bhakta Surdas (1942)
 Chandni (1942)
 Dhiraj (1942)
 Dukh Sukh (1942)
 Fariyad (1942)
 Iqrar (1942)
 Maheman (1942)
 Return of Toofan Mail (1942)
 Dhandora (1941)
 Pardesi (1941)
 Sasural (1941)
 Shaadi (1941)
 Ummeed (1941)
 Aaj Ka Hindustan (1940)
 Achhut (1940)
 Diwali (1940)
 Holi (1940)
 Musafir (1940)
 Pagal (1940)
 Adhuri Kahani (1939)
 Nadi Kinare (1939)
 Sant Tulsidas (1939)
 Thokar (1939)
 Baazigar (1938)
 Ban Ki Chidiya (1938)
 Billi (1938)
 Gorakh Aya (1938)
 Prithvi Putra (1938)
 Professor Waman MSc (1938)
 Rikshawala (1938)
 Secretary (1938)
 Dil Faroshi (1937)
 Mitti Ka Putla (1937)
 Pardesi Pankhi (1937)
 Shama Parwana (1937)
 Sharafi Loot (1937)
 Toofani Toli (1937)
 Zamin Ka Chand (1937)
 Chalak Chor (1936)
 Dil Ka Daku (1936)
 Jwalamukhi (1936)
 Laheri Lala (1936)
 Matlabi Duniya (1936)
 Prabhu Ka Pyara (1936)
 Raj Ramani (1936)
 Rangila Raja (1936)
 Sipahi Ki Sajni (1936)
 Barrister's Wife (1935)
 College Girl (1935)
 Desh Dasi (1935)
 Kimti Ansoo (1935)
 Noore Watan (1935)
 Raat Ki Rani (1935)
 Gunsundari (1934)
 Kashmeera (1934)
 Nadira (1934)
 Sitamgar (1934)
 Toofan Mail (1934)
 Toofani Taruni (1934)
 Veer Babruvahan (1934)
 Bhola Shikar (1933)
 Bhool Bhulaiya (1933)
 Krishna Sudama (1933)
 Miss 1933 (1933)
 Pardesi Preetam (1933)
 Lal Sawar (1932)
 Sipahsalar (1932)
 The Captain (1932)
 Bombay The Mysterious (1931)
 Bugles of War (1931)
 Desert Damsel (1931)
 Drums of Love (1931)
 Hoor-E-Roshan (1931)
 Love Birds (1931)
 Milkmaid (1931)
 Painted Angel (1931)
 Prince Charming (1931)
 Sinning Souls (1931)
 Siren of Baghdad (1931)
 The Knife (1931)
 Beloved Rogue (1930)
 Castles in the Air (1930)
 Divine Dowry (1930)
 Glory of India (1930)
 Jawan Mard (1930)
 Love Angle (1930)
 Magic Flame (1930)
 My Darling (1930)
 Outlaw of Sorath (1930)
 Patriot (1930)
 Ranak Devi (1930) based on Ranakadevi legend
 Romances of Radha (1930)
 The Tigress (1930)
 Wild Flower (1930)

References

External links
 
  Gomolo Profile

1898 births
1975 deaths
People from Jamnagar
Hindi-language film directors
Film producers from Gujarat
Hindi film producers
University of Mumbai alumni
20th-century Indian film directors
Indian silent film producers
Film directors from Gujarat
Hindi screenwriters
Screenwriters from Gujarat
20th-century Indian screenwriters